La Mariée (French for "The Bride") is a 1950 painting on canvas, measuring 68×53 cm, by Russian-French artist Marc Chagall. It is held in a private collection in Japan.

La Mariée was prominently featured in the 1999 film Notting Hill.

The painting
Chagall paintings often feature young women or couples, but in La Mariée the focus is on a singular young woman in quasi-wedding attire with a bouquet of flowers. Described by a Chagall fan as "an ode to young love", the woman is presented to the viewer in a bold and conspicuous fashion, as if the viewer is the one marrying her.

Colours
The second peculiarity of La Mariée compared to the majority of other Chagall paintings is the choice of colors. The young woman is dressed in a red dress lively, with a virginal white veil draped over her head, while the background is mostly a mix of fresh and soft blue and gray. This effect allows the image of the woman to jump off the canvas and attract the viewer's attention. It is evident that Chagall has attempted to highlight the woman, as is tradition in every marriage.

Images in La Mariée
The wedding is the major theme of the painting, and includes a feature found in other Chagall paintings and in many other European artworks of the twentieth century, animals playing musical instruments. In this case it's a goat playing a cello. The painting also shows a man hanging over the head of the bride with his hands on her veil, a church which stands in the background almost as an afterthought, a man playing a flute, a girl with pigtails, a fish  with arms holding a candle and a chair, several more buildings, and a squirrel.

Notting Hill

In the 1999 film Notting Hill, Julia Roberts' character Anna Scott sees a poster of La Mariée in the home of Hugh Grant's character, William Thacker. Later in the film Anna, in proclaiming her love for William, gives him what is presumably the original.

According to director Roger Michell in an article in Entertainment Weekly, the painting was chosen because screenwriter Richard Curtis was a fan of Chagall's work, and because La Mariée "depicts a yearning for something that's lost." Producers had a reproduction made for use in the film, but had to first get permission from the painting's owners and obtain clearance from the British Design and Artists Copyright Society. Finally, according to producer Duncan Kenworthy, "... we had to agree to destroy it. They were concerned that if our fake was too good, it might float around the market and create problems." The article notes that the real painting could have been "worth between $500,000 and $1 million." A closely related work by Chagall, also called La Mariée, was sold in 2003 by Christies for just above US$1 million.

See also
List of artworks by Marc Chagall

References

1950 paintings
Paintings by Marc Chagall
Goats in art
Musical instruments in art
Churches in art
Fish in art
Squirrels in art
Works about wedding